Tunisia competed at the World Games 2017 in Wroclaw, Poland, from 20 July 2017 to 30 July 2017.

Competitors

Boules Sports
Tunisia  has qualified at the 2017 World Games:

Petanque Women's Singles Precision Shooting - 1 quota

References 

Nations at the 2017 World Games
2017 in Tunisian sport
2017